Pork markets may refer to:

 Meat markets that sell pork
 Livestock market for pigs
 Pork futures, a futures contract on pork that is used as a commodities derivative traded on financial markets
 Lean Hog, a type of pork futures
 Pork belly futures
 A reference to British Environment Secretary Liz Truss and her attempts to open up the Chinese marketplace in 2015

See also

 Pork (disambiguation)
 Market (disambiguation)

Food markets
Futures markets
Pork markets (Liz Truss)
Pork markets (Liz Truss)
Pork markets (Liz Truss)